Raymond Michael Garvey (born 3 May 1973) is an Irish singer, songwriter and guitarist now residing in Germany. In 1998, he formed the band Reamonn. Over the 11 years that Garvey was their frontman, they saw chart-topping success in Europe, with a number of gold and platinum selling albums, Tuesday, Dream No. 7, Beautiful Sky, Wish and Eleven and several sold out European tours. In 2011, after the release of the band's best-of album/DVD "Eleven", and a best-of tour, the band parted ways. Garvey took this time to pursue a solo career, which gave birth to his first solo album "Can't Stand the Silence". This album saw Garvey's transition from anthem rock with Reamonn, to alternative electro pop.

Solo work 
As a solo artist, Garvey has written songs for a variety of acts, including Paul van Dyk, Jam and Spoon, Roger Cicero and The BossHoss. Rea has also collaborated with Apocalyptica, In Extremo, Nelly Furtado, Mary J Blige, Jam & Spoon, The BossHoss and ATB. In 2005, Rea collaborated with Nelly Furtado on the track "All Good Things (Come to an End)", for her 2006 album, Loose. The two also toured together in France and the Netherlands during 2007.

Garvey first showed his fascination with electronic music in 2001, on the title track "Be Angeled" for the movie Loveparade. This was the first of many collaborations with the DJ team Jam and Spoon. The song was performed for the first time in memory of Mark Spoon at the start of the Love Parade in July 2006. In 2007, Rea appeared on a track titled "Let Go" for Paul van Dyk's album In Between. Rea has also worked on a solo collaboration with Xavier Naidoo, with whom he recorded Falco's song "Jeanny" in 2002 and "My Child" for his solo debut album Can't Stand the Silence in 2011. The latter was a multi-platinum success, following the break-up with his former band Reamonn in early 2011.

Garvey was also one of the four coaches on the German version of The Voice, The Voice of Germany for season 1-2, 5-6, 9-10 and 12. The winner of the second season was British singer-songwriter Nick Howard, who was on Garvey's team.

In 2005, Garvey together with Xavier Naidoo, Sasha and comedian Michael Mittermeier, paid tribute to the Rat Pack in a live performance called Alive & Swingin''', in aid of Garvey's charity organisation, Saving an Angel. Due to its success, the four took to the stage again, in early 2011, to a sold-out tour. As the demand for the German Rat Pack grew, the four continued to tour in 2012 and, with their big band, were set to take another encore in 2014.

Garvey won the 2021 edition of the Free European Song Contest, a spin-off of the Eurovision Song Contest created by the German TV Channel ProSieben to have a version of the original contest when the Covid-19 pandemic hit the world. He represented Ireland with his song 'The One' placing first with 116 points out of 16 songs.

 Discography 

 Studio albums 

 Singles 
 As lead artist 

 As featured artist 

 Awards 
 2010: Echo: In the category Honour Echo for Social Engagement'
 2012: Diva: In the category Music Artist of the Year

References

External links 

Rea Garvey channel on YouTube
Saving An Angel – Garvey's charity organisation
Giveclearwater – organisation Garvey is a founder and ambassador of

1973 births
Living people
Irish rock singers
Irish rock guitarists
Irish male guitarists
Musicians from County Kerry
People from Tralee
Irish emigrants to Germany
21st-century Irish male  singers
21st-century guitarists